The 2017 BC Lions season was the 60th season for the team in the Canadian Football League (CFL) and their 64th overall. The Lions finished the season in 5th place in the West Division with a 7–11 record and missed the playoffs for the first time since 1996, ending their playoff streak at 20 seasons, the second longest in CFL history. 

This was the 11th year with Wally Buono as the team's head coach and his 15th year as general manager.

This was the eighth consecutive season that the Lions held their training camp at Hillside Stadium in Kamloops, British Columbia.

Offseason

Free agents
The following is a list of players whose contracts are/were set to expire on February 14, 2017 at 9AM PDT. Players are eligible to re-sign with the Lions prior to that date and, if not signed or released before then, are eligible to sign with any team they choose.

CFL draft
The 2017 CFL Draft took place on May 7, 2017. The Lions had nine selections in the eight round draft after acquiring an additional first-round pick from the Montreal Alouettes in exchange for the negotiating rights to Vernon Adams.

Preseason

 Games played with colour uniforms.

Regular season

Standings

Schedule

 Games played with colour uniforms.
 Games played with white uniforms.

Team

Roster

Coaching staff

References

BC Lions seasons
2017 Canadian Football League season by team
2017 in British Columbia